The IndyCar Series, currently known as the NTT IndyCar Series under sponsorship, is the highest class of regional North American open-wheel single-seater formula racing cars in the United States, which has been conducted under the auspices of various sanctioning bodies since 1920 after two initial attempts in 1905 and 1916. The series is self-sanctioned by its parent company, INDYCAR, LLC., which began in 1996 as the Indy Racing League (IRL) and was created by then Indianapolis Motor Speedway owner Tony George as a competitor to Championship Auto Racing Teams (CART). In 2008, the IndyCar Series merged with CART's successor, the Champ Car World Series and the history and statistics of both series, as well as those from its predecessors, were unified.

The series' premier event is the Indianapolis 500, which was first held in 1911.

Overview

Series name
For 1996–1997, the series was simply referred to as the Indy Racing League. For 1998–1999, the series garnered its first title sponsor, and was advertised as the Pep Boys Indy Racing League. In 2000, the series sold its naming rights to Internet search engine Northern Light, and the series was named the Indy Racing Northern Light Series.

The name IndyCar Series was officially adopted beginning in 2003, as the series was now legally entitled to use it due to the expiration of a 1996 legal settlement with Championship Auto Racing Teams (CART). The series began to progressively downplay the former IRL name, changing its name to simply IndyCar for the 2008 season. The company was similarly renamed in 2011.

Izod signed a six-year deal to become the series title sponsor beginning on November 5, 2009 through 2014,  but the sponsonship was terminated at the end of the 2013 season. In 2014, Verizon Communications became title sponsor of the series through 2018. In January 2019, it was announced that Japanese communications company NTT would become title sponsor and official technology partner of the IndyCar Series.

Cars and technology history and current specifications

The IndyCar Series allows manufacturers to develop different types of engines, while every team uses the same chassis. Currently, Dallara provides a specification chassis to all teams, with Honda and Chevrolet providing teams different engines.

Chassis

1996–2011
In the series' first season (1996), 1992 to 1995 model year CART chassis built by Lola and Reynard were used. The first new Indycar came into being in 1997. Tony George specified new technical rules for less expensive cars and production-based engines. The move effectively outlawed the CART chassis and turbocharged engines that had been the mainstay of the Indianapolis 500 since the late 1970s. 

Starting with the 2003 season, the series rules were changed to require chassis manufacturers to be approved by the league before they could build cars. Prior to that, any interested party could build a car, provided it met the rules and was made available to customers at the league-mandated price. In total, four manufacturers have built IndyCar chassis.

Dallara began producing Indycars for the 1997 season. The Dallara and G Force chassis were relatively evenly matched over their first few seasons, but eventually, the Dallara began to win more races. This caused more teams to switch to the Dallara, further increasing their success. As of 2017, a Dallara chassis has been used by 17 Indy 500 winners, although there have not been any competing manufacturers since 2008. Dallara was also tapped to build the Firestone Indy Lights machines. After the withdrawal of factory support from Panoz Auto Development, they are the only supplier of new chassis.

The G Force chassis was introduced in 1997 and won the 1997 and 2000 Indy 500 races. In 2002, Élan Motorsport Technologies bought G Force, and the chassis was renamed "Panoz G Force", and then shortened to "Panoz" in 2005. In 2003 a new model was introduced, and it won the Indy 500 in 2003–2004 and finished second in 2005. It fell out of favor starting in 2006, and by then, only one had finished in the top ten at Indy. Little factory support was given to IndyCar teams by Panoz after that point, as they had concentrated on their DP01 chassis for the rival Champ Car World Series. By 2008, only one Panoz saw track time, an aborted second-weekend effort at Indy, that resulted in Phil Giebler being injured in a practice crash.

Riley & Scott produced IndyCar chassis from 1997 to 2000. Their initial effort, the Mark V, was introduced late in the 1997 season, severely limiting its potential market. It also proved to be uncompetitive. After Riley & Scott was purchased by Reynard, an all-new model, the Mark VII, was introduced for the 2000 season. It won in Phoenix, the second race of the season (driven by Buddy Lazier), but was off the pace at Indy and was quickly dropped by its teams.

Falcon Cars were founded by Michael Kranefuss and Ken Anderson in 2002 as the third approved chassis supplier for the 2003 season. One rolling chassis was completed and shown, but it was never fitted with a working engine and never ran. No orders were ever filled. Superficially, IndyCar machines closely resemble those of other open-wheeled formula racing cars, with front and rear wings and prominent airboxes. Originally, the cars were unique, being designed specifically for oval racing; for example, the oil and cooling systems were asymmetrical to account for the pull of liquids to the right side of the cars. Later cars were designed to accommodate the added requirements of road racing.

Because of a schedule conflict, the Champ Car World Series spec Panoz DP01, with a Cosworth engine, was run in an IndyCar Series points event in the 2008 Toyota Grand Prix of Long Beach.

2012–2014

In 2010, IndyCar announced that it would officially adopt a single-make chassis formula, beginning in 2012 among a selection of proposals from interested parties, and set up the ICONIC (Innovative, Competitive, Open-Wheel, New, Industry-Relevant, Cost-Effective) Advisory Committee to make a final recommendation. Proposals were submitted and announced by BAT Engineering, Dallara, Lola, Swift, as well as the radical DeltaWing design that was penned by Ben Bowlby and financed by Chip Ganassi. 

On July 2010, IndyCar announced that Dallara had won the contract to remain as the series' single chassis supplier. In 2012 the series adopted the Dallara IR-12 chassis as a cost control method, and IndyCar negotiated a price of $349,000 per chassis. The new specification also improved safety, the most obvious feature being the partial enclosure around the rear wheels, which acts to prevent cars ramping up over another vehicle's back end. This chassis was intended to support multiple aerodynamic kits, but introduction of these was delayed until 2015, with teams citing costs.

After the events of the 2011 IZOD IndyCar World Championships the chassis was nicknamed DW12 in honor of Dan Wheldon.

2015–2017
In 2015, teams began running aero kits developed by their engine manufacturers as a first-ever Dallara DW12 facelift. The kits, while increasing speeds and offering a clear distinction between the two manufacturers, did lead to significant cost increases. Further, Chevrolet's aero kit was the more dominant with Honda only able to mount a competitive charge on ovals due to having slightly better engine power. While Honda was able to make gains in 2016, after two years of development the kits were frozen for 2017, and starting in 2018 all cars ran the same aero package again. To further help reduce costs, IndyCar allowed teams to shop for competitively priced non-safety-related parts such as brakes instead of mandating parts from specific suppliers.

IndyCar had hoped to set a new speed record at the Indianapolis Motor Speedway by 2016 with the introduction of aero kits and the development work associated with them. However, after a series of safety concerns during practice for the 2015 Indianapolis 500 with the Chevrolet aero kit package, this did not come about.

2018–present
The 2017 season was the third and final year contested with the Chevrolet and Honda aero kits outfitted to the Dallara DW12 chassis. Beginning in 2018, all DW12 Safety Cell chassis was fitted with a universal bodywork kit. Digital renderings for the common bodywork kit, referred to as the 'IR18' car, were released in early May 2017 as a second facelift of Dallara DW12. The car was officially unveiled in late July, and the universal aero kit became known as the UAK18 bodywork. 

The bodywork is inspired by CART's 1990s and 2000s designs, with a more streamlined appearance. The redesigned aero kit reduces both aerodynamic downforce and team and manufacturer design development costs. The universal Aero Kit was designed without the wheel guards of the DW12 chassis, which were deemed ineffective and proved prone to breaking. The IR-18 also lacks an air inlet above the cockpit, a first for an IndyCar Series chassis (most Champ Car chassis had been designed that way). The new Aero Kit also has fewer small aerodynamic pieces that can become broken or dislodged, with the intent to reduce the amount of debris that ends up on the track and expenses from repairs. The "aeroscreen" cockpit protection was added in time for the 2020 season, and some minor modifications were eventually conducted to reduce the intense heat caused by stagnant air on the drivers.

Transmission, gearbox, and clutch
For the transmission gearboxes, all IndyCar Series cars currently use an electronically actuated AGS (Assisted Gearchange System) 6-speed semi-automatic sequential gearbox with an electro-pneumatically operated paddle-shift system and a pneumatic clutch with semi-automatic activation, supplied by Xtrac Limited since the 2008 season. All current IndyCar transmissions use pneumatic actuation for the shifting and clutch, so the clutch is therefore only needed for launching the car from a standstill, and the clutch isn't required for gear shifting. From 1996 to 2007, all IndyCar Series cars used a hand-shifted 6-speed sequential manual transmission with a shift stick lever, supplied also by Xtrac since 2000 season until 2007. The clutches of all IndyCar Series cars are carbon with steel housing 3-plate clutch operated by foot-pedal in 1996–2011 later hand-paddle steering wheel clutch in 2012–present and provided by AP Racing. Mechanical limited-slip differentials are also allowed and constant velocity joint tripod driveshafts are also used. All IndyCar Series car drivetrains are currently rear mid-engine with rear-wheel-drive layout.

Brakes
Since the formation of IndyCar Series in 1996, the brake package for the IndyCar Series was slimmer carbon brake rotors with 4-pot brake calipers and carbon pads on all-oval races until 2011. The thicker steel brake rotors with 6-pot brake calipers and carbon pads were introduced in 2005 for road and street course races for stronger braking while approaching sharper turns even hairpins. From 2012 onwards, IndyCar Series ditched the steel brake discs in favor of carbon brake rotors on all types of tracks but the caliper configuration remained the same as 1996–2011.

PFC currently supplying brake packages for all IndyCar Series cars since 2017 season (disc only) and later increased their involvement from the 2018 season (supplying the calipers and rest of other brake packages). Previously Brembo supplied the brake packages in 2012–2016 (full brake package), 2017 (caliper only), and Alcon in 2003–2011.

Wheel rims
BBS and O.Z. Racing has been supplying forged wheels since 1996. The wheel rims for all IndyCar Series cars are made of aluminum alloy.

Tires
Firestone is currently the tire supplier for the series since the 1996 season and later increased to sole tire supplier since 2000 season.  Previously, Goodyear had also supplied tires from 1996 to 1999 for several teams, before withdrawing their support.  The IndyCar Series runs the bespoke compounds since 1996 and re-profiled in 2003. The front tire sizes are 305/45-R15 (10.0/25.8-R15) and the rear tire sizes are 415/40-R15 (14.5/28.0-R15). The compounds and construction of IndyCar Series tires unique to each mounting position on the race car.  For road/street events, there are unique primary and alternative specifications for dry conditions, along with specially designed rain tires for wet conditions.  For oval racing, a single set of specifications is used, based upon the configuration and speed of the track, as well as having the right rear tire diameter constructed to be slightly larger than the left rear, (also known as stagger) to aid in high speed cornering.

Suspension
The suspension of all IndyCar Series cars is double A-arm, pushrod, with third spring and anti-roll bar configuration multilink.

Cockpit and safety components

All NTT IndyCar Series cars use carbon-fiber shell driver's seats with 6-point safety restraints. The cars' steering wheels are designed by Cosworth with a system of buttons that allow the drivers to make adjustments to their cars mid-race. All IndyCar Series cars were equipped with Pi Research Sigma Wheel to Display data display units from 2001–2017 until they were replaced by Cosworth's Configurable Display Unit 4.3 display from 2018 onwards (although in 2018 some smaller low-budget IndyCar Series teams still utilized old Pi Research Sigma Wheel instead of new Cosworth Configurable Display Unit 4.3 due to cost reasons).

The cockpits of all IndyCar Series cars are still open but protected by zylon, a foot protection bulkhead, and cockpit padding.

From the 2020 season onwards, the IndyCar Series implemented a cockpit protection system. This consists of a combination of the Halo mandated in Formula One and a reinforced windscreen dubbed the "aeroscreen", provided by Red Bull Advanced Technologies, to lessen the probability of traumatic head injuries from flying debris.

Other components
All IndyCar Series cars carry an Electronic Control Unit. Live telemetry is used only for television broadcasts, but the data can be recorded from the ECU to the computer if the car is in the garage tents and not on the track. Previously Motorola supplied IndyCar Series ECU in 2003–2009 for Honda-powered cars, also Denso supplied IndyCar Series ECU in 2003–2005 for Toyota-powered cars and also Zytek supplied IndyCar Series ECU in 2002–2005 for Chevrolet-powered cars.

Rearview mirrors for all IndyCar Series cars are fully mandated to easily enable viewing opponents behind.

Fuel

Methanol
At its inception, the IRL used methanol racing fuel, which had been the de facto standard in American open-wheel racing since the 1964 Indianapolis 500 Eddie Sachs - Dave MacDonald crash. Methanol had long provided a safer alternative to gasoline. It had a higher flash point, was easily extinguishable with water, and burned invisible. With the IRL's introduction of night races in 1997, the burning of methanol fuel was visible for the first time, seen with a light blue haze. With this in mind, in an effort to make it more visible in case of fire during daylight hours, additional mixtures were placed in the fuel. As a safety feature, the methanol would burn with color.

Ethanol
In 2005, the driver Paul Dana brought the sponsorship of the Ethanol Promotion and Information Council (EPIC) to his IndyCar team. EPIC is a consortium of ethanol producers that advocate the increased use of ethanol. EPIC was anxious to address public concerns of that era that ethanol use led to engine damage and poor performance when used in road cars. As a marketing effort, it was believed that sponsoring an IndyCar could be used as a tool to promote education and awareness of ethanol use and to curb the spread of erroneous information.

Dana was killed in a crash in 2006, but the IRL had already begun a transition to ethanol fuel. For the 2006 season the fuel was a 90%/10% mixture of methanol and ethanol. Starting in 2007, the league advertised "100% Fuel Grade Ethanol," the first competitive series to utilize renewable fuel. The mixture was actually 98% ethanol and 2% gasoline, provided by Lifeline Foods of Saint Joseph, Missouri. The additives satisfy the U.S. government's demand that the alcohol is unfit for human consumption and add visible color in case of fire. However, 2010 São Paulo Indy 300, held in Brazil –outside of the U.S. regulations– utilized a full E100 mixture, the first instance in the sport.

To compensate for the loss of power due to the use of ethanol, the displacement was increased back to 3.5 liters.  Since ethanol gets better fuel mileage than methanol, the fuel tanks in the car were decreased.

Compared to methanol, human contact with the current ICS fuel is much less harsh, and the fumes much less irritating.  The fumes are often compared with the sweet smell of apple cider or apple cobbler.  Unlike methanol, ethanol is not caustic and does not cause chemical burns when it comes in contact with the skin.  It also is less polluting when spilled compared to methanol.

In May 2010, Sunoco became the official fuel of the series starting in mid-2010 with an immediate effect, running through 2018. For the 2012 season, the ethanol fuel blend rate was reduced to 85% blend in a reference of road car relevance. Speedway LLC took over as series official fuel supplier beginning from 2019 season onwards, but the E85 formula still retained until at 2022.

From 2023 onwards Shell USA (North American division of Shell plc) will supply 100% Ethanol-sourced fuel for the first time since 2011.

Fuel cell
The fuel cell for all current IndyCar Series cars are made of rubber and are covered with a Kevlar-fitted blanket for extra protection in side impacts. Since 2012 the capacity has been .

Engines

First generation (1996)

Engine competition era (1996)
The initial 1996 IRL season, as well as the first two races of the 1996–97 season, featured engines with specifications leftover from the rival CART series competition. Those chassis/engine combinations were essentially under the same rules utilized by teams that participated in the 1995 Indianapolis 500, which was sanctioned by USAC. V-8 powerplants were allowed the typical  of pressure boost. The Menard-Buick V6 engine used in 1996, however, was an updated powerplant from the 1995 version. In addition, the V-6 stock block engines (Buick-Menard) were allowed  of boost at all races, instead of just at Indianapolis. During the CART era, V-6 stock blocks were only allowed  at all races outside of Indy, which was a decided disadvantage and left the engine out of favor.

Ford-Cosworth reluctantly provided support to teams wishing to run their older-spec engines in the IRL, a major point of contention for CART management, to whom Ford-Cosworth was an official engine supplier. The Ilmor Mercedes V-8 engine, also a mainstay CART powerplant, was permitted, but the only time it was used as a one-off at the 1996 Indy 500 by Galles Racing.

Second generation (1997–2011)

Engine competition era (1997–2005)

Starting in 1997, IRL cars were powered by 4.0-litre V8, four-stroke piston, Otto cycle methanol-burning, production prototype-based, naturally-aspirated internal combustion engines and electronic indirect multi-point port fuel injection, produced by General Motors (under the Oldsmobile Aurora label) and Nissan (badged as Infiniti). These engines utilized 90° crankshafts, and while the engine blocks were to be production-based, they were not "stock blocks" like the Buick or Menard engines of the 1980s and 1990s. They were purpose-built racing engines.

The engine formula was changed with the 2000–2004 formula. The engines also switched to 180° crankshafts, and the rev limits were adjusted from time to time. These engines made , ran on 109-octane methanol racing fuel, and revved to 10,300 rpm, all while weighing only . This formula was used through 2003. In 2004, in the wake of several crashes including the fatal crash of Tony Renna and the severe crash of Kenny Bräck, the displacement was reduced to 3.0-liters using the existing engine blocks to curb top speeds (started from the 2004 Indianapolis 500).

Infiniti's engines, though reliable, were significantly down on power compared to the Auroras in 1997, leading many of the teams that had initially opted for the Infiniti to switch. By the end of the 1998 season, only a handful of low-budget teams were using the Infiniti. However, early in the 1999 season, Cheever Racing, a well-funded team, was brought on to develop the engine with team owner Eddie Cheever expanding the team to two cars and bringing on his brother Ross Cheever as a test driver. By 2000, the engine had improved markedly and Cheever captured the marque's first win at Pikes Peak International Raceway. However, despite the improved success, few teams made the switch to the Infiniti and the company left the series after the 2002 season to focus on powering the league's new Infiniti Pro Series (now Firestone Indy Lights).

As part of General Motors' discontinuance of the Oldsmobile name, the Olds engine was rebadged as the Chevrolet starting with the 2002 season. However, the effort would lack in competitiveness against Toyota and Honda, which came to the IRL in 2003 from the rival CART series. In August 2003, Chevrolet announced to the public its "Gen IV" motor, a rebadged Cosworth motor for competition. At the time, Cosworth was owned by Ford. On November 4, 2004, Chevrolet stated that it would be ending its IRL engine program effective with the end of the 2005 season, citing costs that exceeded value, according to then GM Racing Director Doug Duchardt, "The investment did not meet our objectives."

Toyota won its first race in Miami, as well as the Indianapolis 500 and the series title. However, Toyota had just one podium in the last seven races of 2004, and only Penske Racing fielded competitive Toyota-powered cars in 2005, while Honda became the dominant engine manufacturer within the series. In November 2005, Toyota company officials announced the company's withdrawal from American open-wheel racing and the immediate discontinuation of its IRL program, coinciding with its entrance into NASCAR's Craftsman Truck Series in 2004, and its discontinuation of its IMSA program.

Single-manufacturer spec engine era (2006–2011)

After Chevrolet and Toyota elected to shut down their IRL involvement after 2005 season (Chevrolet temporarily hiatus from IndyCar Series for six years while Toyota USA elected to focus on NASCAR involvement), Honda became the only standard spec-engine manufacturer in the IndyCar Series starting in 2006 and continued in that capacity through 2011 as it was announced by Indy Racing League president & chief operating officer Brian Barnhart and Honda Performance Development president Robert Clarke on December 15, 2005. The IndyCar Series carried on with only one engine manufacturer in spite of the television agreement required at least two or three engine manufacturers to participate in the series to ensure future continuity. The Honda Indy V8 engine was partnered and co-developed by Ilmor, which is part owned by Roger Penske for tune-up, engine maintenance, arrangement and trackside support. The engine displacement was reverted from  beginning from 2007 season. Leading IndyCar teams like Penske Racing, Andretti Green Racing, Chip Ganassi Racing, Rahal Letterman Racing and A. J. Foyt Enterprises received free engines from Honda due to direct works partnership but the rest of them were utilizing engine purchase payment system.

During that time, since the IndyCar Series had only one engine manufacturer, Honda focused on minimizing engine failure and minimizing costs instead of defeating rivals. As such, the engines were moderately de-tuned. The engines proved themselves to be quite durable — there had been no engine failures at Indy from 2006 to 2010, which also lowered the number of crashes. Most of the engines, including those used for the Indy 500, are used for multiple races and were intended to last  between rebuilds. The Honda engines were only available via lease arrangement from Honda, which, for the 2010 full season, cost $935,000 U.S. per season, per car.

IndyCar Series engines were rev-limited to 10,300 rpm and produce approximately 650 hp. A 'push-to-pass' system was intermitently adopted since the middle portion of the 2009 season, which increased the numbers to 10.500 rpm and 690 hp when employed. The valve train is a dual overhead camshaft configuration with four valves per cylinder. The fuel feed of Honda Indy V8 engine was an electronic indirect multipoint port fuel injection. The crankshaft is made of alloy steel, with five main bearing caps. The pistons are forged aluminum alloy, while the connecting rods are machined alloy steel. The electronic engine management system is supplied by Motorola, firing a CDI digital inductive ignition system. The engine lubrication is a dry-sump type, cooled by a single water pump. In 2009, Honda froze the Indy V8 engine development for the 2009–2011 seasons due to Honda focusing on a new third-generation V6 turbo engine for the 2012 season.

Third generation (2012–present)

The current, third-generation IndyCar formula was introduced in 2012 including two new manufacturers, and marked the return of the IndyCar Series engine manufacturer competition war since the 2005 season. The engines are now fuel-efficient DOHC 2.2-liter twin-turbo V6 with four-stroke piston Otto cycle developing an estimated 550–750 hp depending on the level of boost used and no inter-cooling systems. Engines are currently supplied by Chevrolet and Honda. Since the 2012 season, McLaren has supplied its TAG-400i engine control unit. No fuel flow restriction exists in the IndyCar Series engine configuration. Chevrolet returned to the series in 2012 to provide all-new, Ilmor developed and engineered, V6 twin-turbocharged engines after six-year hiatus while Honda still remain committed to the series also to provide all-new V6 single-turbocharged engines in the same year. Lotus Cars provided an engine developed by Judd in 2012, but left the series in 2013 after lack of interest from teams in running the underdeveloped and uncompetitive Lotus engine. Porsche also expressed interest in joining the series as a third engine supplier in 2019. Ultimately Porsche backed out when IndyCar refused to allow them to field a hybrid powertrain. Coincidentally, IndyCar announced its plans for a hybrid powertrain one month later. Chevrolet was the first engine manufacturer to utilize the twin-turbocharged configuration alongside Lotus in 2012 while Honda was utilized the single-turbocharger in 2012–2013. Honda abandoned the single-turbocharged after 2013 in favor of twin-turbochargers from 2014 until the present. From 2024 season onwards the hybrid systems will be introduced, consisting of a multi-phase motor, inverter, and battery that will create energy recovery from the car's braking system as well as current engine displacement still remained.

Turbocharger 
Turbochargers were reintroduced from the start of 2012 season. The turbo configuration is currently twin-turbocharged that mandated since 2014 and producing the turbo boost level pressure range restricted to  depending on track shape. American turbocharger company BorgWarner Inc. currently supplies exclusive turbocharger kits including wastegate for all IndyCar Series cars from 2014 season onwards using an EFR7163 model in order to save costs. Previously a BorgWarner EFR9180 single turbo was used exclusively by Honda-powered cars while BorgWarner EFR6758 twin turbos were used exclusively by Chevrolet and Lotus (2012) powered cars. The turbochargers of all IndyCar Series engines are incorporated with intercoolers.

Spark plugs
Bosch (Chevrolet) and NGK (Honda) have provided spark plugs for all IndyCar Series cars since 2012. Previously NGK was an exclusive spark plugs supplier in 2006–2011 when Honda was the standard IndyCar Series engine supplier. Previously Denso also was a sparkplugs supplier in 2003–2005 for Toyota-powered cars.

Performance

Specifications

1997–1999
Engine displacement:  DOHC V8 
Gearbox: 6-speed sequential manual transmission
Weight:  including driver, fuel and all lubricants and coolants
Power output: 
Fuel: 100% Methanol
Fuel capacity: 
Fuel delivery: Fuel injection (electronic indirect ported multi-point)
Aspiration: Naturally-aspirated
Length:  minimum on intermediate and long ovals;  maximum on short ovals
Width:  (outside wheel rims);  minimum (measured at the hub centerline)
Wheelbase: , plus or minus 
Steering: Variable-assisted manual, rack and pinion
Tires: Firestone Firehawk and Goodyear Eagle radial dry slick for all tracks

2000–2002
Engine displacement:  DOHC V8 
Gearbox: 6-speed sequential manual transmission
Weight:  including driver, fuel and all lubricants and coolants
Power output: 
Fuel: 100% Methanol
Fuel capacity: 
Fuel delivery: Fuel injection (electronic indirect ported multi-point)
Aspiration: Naturally-aspirated
Length:  minimum on intermediate and long ovals;  maximum on short ovals
Width:  (outside wheel rims);  minimum (measured at the hub centerline)
Wheelbase: , plus or minus 
Steering: Variable-assisted manual, rack and pinion
Tires: Firestone Firehawk radial dry slick for all tracks

2003
Engine displacement:  DOHC V8 
Gearbox: 6-speed sequential manual transmission
Weight:  including driver, fuel and all lubricants and coolants
Power output: 
Fuel: 100% Methanol
Fuel capacity: 
Fuel delivery: Fuel injection (electronic indirect ported multi-point)
Aspiration: Naturally-aspirated
Length:  minimum on intermediate and long ovals;  maximum on short ovals
Width:  (outside wheel rims);  minimum (measured at the hub centerline)
Wheelbase: , plus or minus 
Steering: Variable-assisted manual, rack and pinion
Tires: Firestone Firehawk radial dry slick for all tracks

2004–2005
Engine displacement:  (first 3 races) later  (started from 2004 Indianapolis 500) DOHC V8 
Gearbox: 6-speed sequential manual transmission
Weight:  on ovals;  on road and street courses (including driver, fuel and all lubricants and coolants) - started from 2005
Power output: 
Fuel: 100% Methanol
Fuel capacity: 
Fuel delivery: Fuel injection (electronic indirect ported multi-point)
Aspiration: Naturally-aspirated
Length:  minimum on intermediate and long ovals;  maximum on short ovals, road and street courses
Width:  (outside wheel rims);  minimum (measured at the hub centerline)
Wheelbase: , plus or minus 
Steering: Variable-assisted manual, rack and pinion
Tires: Firestone Firehawk radial dry slick for all tracks and treaded wet only for road/street courses if raining (introduced since 2005)

2006
Engine displacement:  DOHC V8 (supplied by Honda Performance Development)
Gearbox: 6-speed sequential manual transmission
Weight:  on ovals;  on road and street courses (including driver, fuel and all lubricants and coolants)
Power output: 
Fuel: EPIC 10% Ethanol + 90% Methanol
Fuel capacity: 
Fuel delivery: Fuel injection (electronic indirect ported multi-point)
Aspiration: Naturally-aspirated
Length:  minimum on intermediate and long ovals;  maximum on short ovals, road and street courses
Width:  (outside wheel rims);  minimum (measured at the hub centerline)
Wheelbase: , plus or minus 
Steering: Variable-assisted manual, rack and pinion
Tires: Firestone Firehawk radial dry slick for all tracks and treaded wet only for road/street courses if raining

2007
Engine displacement:  DOHC V8 (supplied by Honda Performance Development)
Gearbox: 6-speed sequential manual transmission
Weight:  on ovals;  on road and street courses (including driver, fuel and all lubricants and coolants)
Power output: 
Fuel: EPIC 98% Ethanol + 2% gasoline
Fuel capacity: 
Fuel delivery: Fuel injection (electronic indirect ported multi-point)
Aspiration: Naturally-aspirated
Length:  minimum on intermediate and long ovals;  maximum on short ovals, road and street courses
Width:  (outside wheel rims);  minimum (measured at the hub centerline)
Wheelbase: , plus or minus 
Steering: Variable-assisted manual, rack and pinion
Tires: Firestone Firehawk radial dry slick for all tracks and treaded wet only for road/street courses if raining

2008
Engine displacement:  DOHC V8 (supplied by Honda Performance Development)
Gearbox: 6-speed paddle-shift gearbox (semi-automatic)
Weight:  on ovals;  on road and street courses (including driver, fuel and all lubricants and coolants)
Power output: 
Fuel: EPIC 98% Ethanol + 2% gasoline
Fuel capacity: 
Fuel delivery: Fuel injection (electronic indirect ported multi-point)
Aspiration: Naturally-aspirated
Length:  minimum on intermediate and long ovals;  maximum on short ovals, road and street courses
Width:  (outside wheel rims);  minimum (measured at the hub centerline)
Wheelbase: , plus or minus 
Steering: Variable-assisted manual, rack and pinion
Tires: Firestone Firehawk radial dry slick for all tracks and treaded wet only for road/street courses if raining

2009
Engine displacement:  DOHC V8 (supplied by Honda Performance Development)
Gearbox: 6-speed paddle-shift gearbox (semi-automatic)
Weight:  on ovals;  on road and street courses (including driver, fuel and all lubricants and coolants)
Power output:  including push-to-pass
Fuel: 98% Ethanol + 2% gasoline
Fuel capacity: 
Fuel delivery: Fuel injection (electronic indirect ported multi-point)
Aspiration: Naturally-aspirated
Length:  minimum on intermediate and long ovals;  maximum on short ovals, road and street courses
Width:  (outside wheel rims);  minimum (measured at the hub centerline)
Wheelbase: 
Steering: Variable-assisted manual, rack and pinion
Tires: Firestone Firehawk radial dry slick for all tracks and treaded wet only for road/street courses if raining

2010-2011
Engine displacement:  DOHC V8 (supplied by Honda Performance Development)
Gearbox: 6-speed paddle-shift gearbox (semi-automatic - must have reverse only for road/street courses)
Weight:  on ovals;  on road and street courses (including driver, fuel and all lubricants and coolants)
Power output:  including push-to-pass
Fuel: Sunoco 98% Ethanol + 2% gasoline
Fuel capacity: 
Fuel delivery: Fuel injection (electronic indirect ported multi-point)
Aspiration: Naturally-aspirated
Length:  minimum on intermediate and long ovals;  maximum on short ovals, road and street courses
Width:  (outside wheel rims);  minimum (measured at the hub centerline)
Wheelbase: 
Steering: Variable-assisted manual, rack and pinion
Tires: Firestone Firehawk radial dry slick for all tracks and treaded wet only for road/street courses if raining

2012–2013
Engine displacement:  DOHC V6
Gearbox: 6-speed paddle-shift gearbox (must have reverse)
Weight:  on 1.5-mile speedways, superspeedways and Indianapolis 500;  on short ovals, road and street courses (including driver, fuel and all lubricants and coolants)
Power output: Venue dependent  (push-to-pass)
Fuel: Sunoco E85 Ethanol + 15% gasoline
Fuel capacity: 
Fuel delivery: Combination of direct and indirect injection that produced  of maximum fuel system pressure
Fuel-mass flow restrictor rate: Unlimited
Aspiration: Single-turbocharged (Honda) and twin-turbocharged (Chevrolet and Lotus)
Turbocharger: BorgWarner EFR9180 (single) and BorgWarner EFR6758 (twin)
Turbo boost pressure (above atmosphere): 
Turbocharger spin rev limit: 116,000 rpm (EFR9180) and 153,900 rpm (EFR6758)
Length:  on road/street course and short ovals;  on 1.5-mile intermediate ovals, superspeedway and Indianapolis 500
Width:  maximum;  minimum (measured outside rim to rim);  overall
Wheelbase:  adjustable
Steering: Variable manual rack and pinion, no power assistance
Tires: Firestone Firehawk radial dry slick for all tracks and treaded wet only for road/street courses if raining

2014–2017
Engine displacement:  DOHC V6
Gearbox: 6-speed paddle-shift gearbox (semi-automatic - must have reverse)
Weight:  on 1.5-mile speedways, superspeedways and Indianapolis 500;  on short ovals, road and street courses (including driver, fuel and all lubricants and coolants)
Power output: Venue dependent  (push-to-pass)
Fuel: Sunoco E85 Ethanol + 15% gasoline
Fuel capacity: 
Fuel delivery: Combination of direct and indirect injection that produced  of maximum fuel system pressure
Fuel-mass flow restrictor rate: Unlimited
Aspiration: Twin-turbocharged
Turbocharger: BorgWarner EFR7163
Turbo boost pressure (above atmosphere):  on superspeedways;  on Indianapolis 500 qualifying;  on short ovals and road/street courses;  push-to-pass
Turbocharger spin rev limit: 150,600 rpm on superspeedways including Indianapolis Motor Speedway oval; 149,500 rpm on short ovals and road/street courses
Length:  on road/street course and short ovals;  on 1.5-mile intermediate ovals, superspeedway and Indianapolis 500
Width:  maximum;  minimum (measured outside rim to rim);  overall
Wheelbase:  adjustable
Steering: Variable manual rack and pinion, no power assistance
Tires: Firestone Firehawk radial dry slick for all tracks and treaded wet only for road/street courses if raining

2018–2019

Engine displacement:  DOHC V6
Gearbox: 6-speed paddle-shift gearbox (semi-automatic - must have reverse)
Weight:  on 1.5-mile speedways, superspeedways and Indianapolis 500;  on short ovals;  road and street courses (including driver, fuel and all lubricants and coolants)
Power output: Venue dependent  (push-to-pass)
Fuel: Sunoco (2018) later Speedway LLC (2019) E85 Ethanol + 15% gasoline
Fuel capacity: 
Fuel delivery: Combination of direct and indirect injection that produced  of maximum fuel system pressure
Fuel-mass flow restrictor rate: Unlimited
Aspiration: Twin-turbocharged
Turbocharger: BorgWarner EFR7163
Turbo boost pressure (above atmosphere):  on superspeedways;  on Indianapolis 500 qualifying;  on short ovals and road/street courses;  push-to-pass
Turbocharger spin rev limit: 150,600 rpm on superspeedways including Indianapolis Motor Speedway oval; 149,500 rpm on short ovals and road/street courses
Length: 
Width:  inches minimum (road/street),  minimum (ovals),  maximum (measured outside rim to rim)
Wheelbase:  adjustable
Steering: Variable manual rack and pinion, no power assistance
Tires: Firestone Firehawk radial dry slick for all tracks and treaded wet only for road/street courses if raining

2020–present

Engine displacement:  DOHC V6
Gearbox: 6-speed paddle-shift gearbox (semi-automatic - must have reverse)
Weight:  on 1.5-mile speedways, superspeedways and Indianapolis 500;  on short ovals;  road and street courses (including addition of aeroscreen + driver, fuel and all lubricants and coolants)
Power output: Venue dependent  (push-to-pass)
Fuel: Speedway LLC (2020–2022) E85 Ethanol + 15% gasoline (2020–2022) later Shell (2023 onwards) E100 Ethanol
Fuel capacity: 
Fuel delivery: Combination of direct and indirect injection that produces  of maximum fuel system pressure
Fuel-mass flow restrictor rate: Unlimited
Aspiration: Twin-turbocharged
Turbocharger: BorgWarner EFR7163
Turbo boost pressure (above atmosphere):  on superspeedways;  on Indianapolis 500 qualifying;  on short ovals and road/street courses;  push-to-pass
Turbocharger spin rev limit: 150,600 rpm on superspeedways including Indianapolis Motor Speedway oval; 149,500 rpm on short ovals and road/street courses
Length: 
Width:  inches minimum (road/street),  minimum (ovals),  maximum (measured outside rim to rim)
Wheelbase:  adjustable
Steering: Variable manual rack and pinion, no power assistance
Tires: Firestone Firehawk radial dry slick for all tracks and treaded wet only for road/street courses if raining

Racetracks

After the split from IndyCar World Series, the Indy Racing League began as a pure oval race series. Alongside the prestigious Indy 500, the 1-mile oval tracks of Phoenix and Loudon were added to the schedule. In addition, the Hulman family oversaw the planning for the construction of a new track at Walt Disney World in Florida. On the new Walt Disney World Speedway the first IRL race took place in January 1996.

After the series was established, ovals used mainly by NASCAR were raced on. These included the newly built racetracks in Las Vegas and Fort Worth as well as the existing speedways of Charlotte and Atlanta. After a series of major accidents at Charlotte and Atlanta and a lack of spectator turnout, however, the ovals of Atlanta, Charlotte, and Las Vegas were removed from the calendar. For the 2001 season, the IRL also began to race on ovals that were being used by CART. The circuits of Homestead and Gateway changed from CART to the calendar of the IRL, with the race at Walt Disney World being dropped in favor of Homestead. In addition, the new 1.5-mile ovals of Kansas, Kentucky, and Chicagoland were added. These tracks were the backbone of the IRL until 2011. After Roger Penske sold his racetracks (Fontana, Michigan, and Nazareth) to the International Speedway Corporation, the IRL began racing at these tracks in the 2002 season. Nazareth Speedway only held three races before ISC closed the track in 2004. Michigan Speedway was raced until the 2007 season and the Auto Club Speedway, formerly California Speedway, until the 2015 season.

The first major change took place in the 2005 season. For the first time in the history of the IRL, races were held at road and street courses. A street course race in St. Petersburg has been added to the calendar. In addition, races at Sonoma and Watkins Glen, the two NASCAR road course circuits were added. In 2007, the Mid-Ohio Sports Car Course was added. After the Champ Car World Series was dissolved in 2008, some of their races were taken over by the IndyCar Series. These are the street races of Long Beach, Detroit, and Toronto, and starting in 2016, Road America. In addition, a road course race at Barber Motorsports Park in Birmingham and an oval race at Iowa Speedway were scheduled and held.

The second big change took place in the 2012 season. In 2011, the series returned to Las Vegas Motor Speedway for the first time since 2000. However, the circuit had been rebuilt for NASCAR, increasing the banking of 12 degrees to progressive banking up to 20 degrees. This new configuration led to tight pack racing. Additionally, a $5 million bonus was offered if a driver from another series or racing discipline win the race, as it would be the last race for the current chassis, and a record 34 cars entered this race (the Indy 500 field, by comparison, is capped at 33 cars). As a result of pack racing in combination with many cars and inexperienced drivers, a major crash occurred on lap 11, injuring several drivers and resulting in the death of defending Indy 500 winner Dan Wheldon. This event led to massive media criticism of oval races for open-wheel vehicles. As a result, and also because of the gradual loss of spectators in the previous seasons, all oval races on 1.5-mile speedways, except Texas Motor Speedway, were removed from the calendar. Only the oval races in Indianapolis, Milwaukee, Iowa, Texas, and Fontana remained for the next three seasons. Instead, more races were held in cities, including Houston, Baltimore, and São Paulo. In the following years, the calendar stabilized, with the return of races in Phoenix, Pocono, and Gateway, although the races at Fontana, Pocono, Phoenix, and Milwaukee were later removed from the schedule due to insufficient crowds or severe crashes, including the fatal crash of Justin Wilson at Pocono in 2015.

Since the 2012 season, the calendar has roughly consisted of 1/3 of oval races, 1/3 of races on permanent natural road courses, and 1/3 of races on temporary street courses in larger cities. In 2019, an IndyCar race was held for the first time on a current Formula 1 racetrack, the "Indycar Classics" at the Circuit of the Americas in Austin, Texas.

Due to government restrictions on major events in 2020 due to the COVID-19 pandemic, many races that were scheduled for the 2020 season were affected. For the first time since 1911, the Indianapolis 500 was not held on the traditional Sunday before Memorial Day. In addition, traditional street races in Long Beach, Detroit, and Toronto were canceled. As compensation, double-header races took place in Road America, Iowa, Mid-Ohio, and Gateway.

Teams

Championship point system

Like other governing bodies, IndyCar awards points based upon where a driver finishes in a race. The winner of a race gets 50 points. The top four drivers are separated by ten, five and three points respectively. The fourth through tenth-place finishers are separated by two points each. Eleventh through twenty-fifth are separated by one point each. All other drivers who start the race score five points. Bonus points are awarded as follows: one point to the driver that earns the pole each race (except at Indianapolis), one point to any driver that leads at least one lap in a race, and two additional bonus points to the driver that leads the most laps each race.

For the Indianapolis 500, qualifying points are awarded for all 33 cars at the Indianapolis 500. The point scale slides based on the teams that qualify for the top-nine shootout, then descending by speed and position.

From 2014-2022, the Indianapolis 500 awarded double points for all finishing positions. Beginning in 2023, double points were dropped and drivers earned the same points as any other race.

In the case of a tie, the IndyCar Series will determine the champion based on the most first-place finishes. If there is still a tie, IndyCar Series will determine the champion by the most second-place finishes, then the most third-place finishes, etc., until a champion is determined. IndyCar Series will apply the same system to other ties in the rankings at the close of the season and at any other time during the season.

Seasons

The following table is a list of championships going only as far back as the latest sanctioning body's existence. However, championships that took place before that period (under previously existed sanctioning bodies) are also counted as part of one continuous championship following the merger of CART/Champ Car into the Indy Racing League in 2008. That is when the IRL acquired all intellectual property and historic records, going as far back as 1909.

  In 1996, Scott Sharp and Buzz Calkins were tied in the final standings and were declared co-champions. Calkins had one win, as opposed to Sharp being winless, but no tiebreakers were in place.
 Although it was Scott Dixon's first year in the IRL IndyCar Series and he won the championship, he was not considered a rookie because of earlier CART experience.
  In 2006, Sam Hornish Jr. and Dan Wheldon were tied in the final standings for first place. This time, IndyCar had tiebreakers, and Hornish clinched the championship by having more victories than Wheldon during the season.
  Between 2006 and 2011, Honda was the sole engine manufacturer of the series and thus no engine manufacturers' championships were awarded during this period.
  Although no report was officially released about it in 2008, IndyCar.com confirmed in 2009 that Danica Patrick being named Most Popular Driver was her "fifth consecutive" win of the award.
  The 2011 season was originally supposed to end at Las Vegas, but the death of Dan Wheldon in an early crash caused IndyCar to abandon the race. The points reset to the standings as of the scheduled penultimate race at Kentucky, with Franchitti winning the championship.
  Posthumously awarded to Dan Wheldon by a vote of members on the official IndyCar Nation website. This marked the first time a part-time driver won the award.
  Dixon and Juan Pablo Montoya finished tied in points, Dixon winning the title based on wins (3 to 2).
  Posthumously awarded to Justin Wilson by a vote of members on the official IndyCar Nation website. This marked the second time a part-time driver won the award.
  Posthumously awarded to Bryan Clauson by a vote of members on the official IndyCar Nation website. This marked the third time a part-time driver won the award.

Individual discipline trophies
Starting in 2010, the series began recognizing two sub-set championship trophies alongside the season championship. The two primary disciplines of IndyCar (ovals and road courses) were named after respective legends of the sport: 
A. J. Foyt and Mario Andretti, respectively. The discipline trophies were created as the series moved closer to a 50/50 split of oval and road races, and to encourage incentive for part-time entries – specifically, those that might prefer to compete in one discipline over the other.

This arrangement also creates a reasonable opportunity for a team to employ the services of two drivers for one season entry. A team could hire a specialist for ovals and a specialist for road/street courses, who combined would maintain the entry's total owner points but individually work towards their own separate disciplines.

Note that street courses are included as part of the road racing discipline. Since 2013, the individual discipline trophies have received markedly less fanfare.

Statistics

Championships by driver

Championships by team

Championships by engine manufacturer

Television
The three-race inaugural season was televised on ABC. The 1996–97 season was broadcast by ABC, CBS and ESPN. In 1998, TNN was added to the rotation. In 1999, Fox Sports Net aired the majority of the races, and the remaining ones aired on Fox, ABC and ESPN2. From 2000 to 2008, ABC and ESPN were the exclusive television partners of the Indy Racing League.

In 2009, Versus (later NBCSN) began a 10-year deal to broadcast 13 IndyCar races per season, whereas the remaining races, including the Indianapolis 500, would remain on ABC through 2018. As of the 2018 season, ABC aired 5 races per-season (plus two days of qualifying for the Indianapolis 500), with NBCSN or other NBCUniversal networks (in the event of scheduling conflicts) airing the remainder of the schedule. On March 21, 2018, it was announced that NBC Sports would become the sole U.S. rightsholder of the IndyCar Series beginning in 2019, under a new three-year contract. NBCSN will continue as the primary broadcast outlet for most races, and overflow content will be available through its subscription service NBC Sports Gold. Eight races per-season will be televised by NBC—including the Indianapolis 500, marking the first time in 54 years that the race was not televised by ABC. With the shut down of NBCSN in 2021, the rights to the IndyCar races moved to USA Network beginning with the 2022 season.

In the United Kingdom, since the launch of BT Sport in August 2013 races are shown on one of the BT branded channels or ESPN. Previous to August 2013, the IndyCar Series races were broadcasts on the Sky Sports family of networks, with the viewing figures of the IndyCar races in the UK outnumbering those of NASCAR races. The IndyCar Series also had highlights of all the races on the channel Five British terrestrial channel and Five USA, but has since been discontinued since the 2009 season. For the 2019 season broadcasts returned to Sky Sports, with the series being shown on their F1 channel.

In Portugal, all of the IndyCar Series are broadcast on Sport TV.

In February 2013, Sportsnet announced that it would become the official Canadian broadcaster of the IndyCar Series beginning in the 2013 season in a five-year deal with the series. The new contract will include broadcasts on the Sportsnet regional networks, Sportsnet One, and City, along with mobile coverage and French rights sub-licensed to TVA Sports. Additionally, Sportsnet would also originate coverage from the Firestone Grand Prix of St. Petersburg, Indianapolis 500, and Honda Indy Toronto with Bill Adam, Todd Lewis, and Rob Faulds. Canadian driver Paul Tracy also joined Sportsnet as an analyst. In 2023 it was announced that TSN would broadcast IndyCar for the first time since 2012 

In Australia, Stan Sport is IndyCar's broadcast partner with highlights also broadcast on Nine Network.

In Brazil, DAZN is IndyCar's broadcast partner in that country since 2019, with all races, qualifying and practice sessions live. Previously, SBT broadcast the first two races of IRL, but following complaints by Tony George because of the schedule of the transmission (VTs at 1:30AM), and because they also aired the CART series, he took the transmission rights from Emerson Fittipaldi gave them to Rede Bandeirantes to broadcast that year's season from the Indy 500 onwards. Band aired the series from 1996 to 2001 and from 2004 until 2020 (the latter period together with BandSports). SporTV also broadcast races from 2001 until 2004. In 2021, the event was broadcast by TV Cultura. The 2022 season will also be broadcast by ESPN (in cable and streaming by Star+).

ESPN is the international broadcast partner of IndyCar Series in the rest of Latin America until 2018 and again since 2022 season.

Eurosport has been the international broadcast partner of IndyCar in most of Europe (except in Bosnia and Herzegovina, Russia, and the United Kingdom).

In the late 2000s, the official website streamed online all races, qualifying and practice sessions unrestricted. That service is now limited in the United States to subscribers of the broadcast partner streaming service (currently Peacock). In 2022, IndyCar launched its streaming service (branded as IndyCar Live) to viewers in certain international territories without local broadcast partner.

Logo history

See also
 IndyCar Series drivers
 List of Indycar races
 List of IndyCar Series teams
 List of IndyCar Series racetracks
 Indianapolis 500
 American open-wheel car racing

References

External links

 
 Official website of the Indianapolis 500

 
Formula racing
Formula racing series
Auto racing series in the United States
Auto racing series in Canada
One-make series
Recurring sporting events established in 1996